Life Story is a British natural-history television series with Mike Gunton, Rupert Barrington and Tom Hugh-Jones from the BBC Natural History Unit on the production team. The six-part series reveals the challenges faced by individual animals at different stages of their lives and was first broadcast on BBC One in 2014. The series is introduced and narrated by David Attenborough.

Production
The series was announced by the BBC on 8 July 2011 with the working title Survival, later changed to Life Story. It is a BBC Television, Discovery Channel and France Télévisions co-production and is the first Natural History Unit series to film using ultra high-definition 4K cameras. The series was marketed by BBC Worldwide at the BBC Worldwide Showcase event in 2014.

The series has been produced with extensive use of surround sound effects, and with out-of-frame sounds changing with each change of shot; something that is often minimised to avoid distraction but which works well on wildlife material. It is currently broadcast with Dolby 5.1 surround on Freesat.

Broadcast

British television
Life Storys world premiere took place at Bristol's Cinema de Lux on 14 October 2014, to coincide with the BBC's 80th anniversary in the city. The television broadcast began on 23 October 2014 on BBC One and BBC One HD. The UK broadcast consisted of six episodes, each of which included a 10-minute making-of documentary called Life Story Diaries.

International
The series was mainly broadcast internationally on BBC Earth channel, with a few exceptions for some countries.

In Canada, Canadian Broadcasting Corporation aired the series on CBC-TV from 11 January 2015.

On 6 June 2015, the series began its run on American television on the Discovery network, premiering on the Discovery Channel, and retained David Attenborough's narration from the original British television broadcasts.

Episodes

Merchandise

DVD and Blu-ray
The series was released in the UK as Region 2, two-disc DVD (BBCDVD3981) and Blu-ray (BBCBD0281) box sets by BBC Worldwide on 1 December 2014.

In United States, both DVD and Blu-ray were released on 29 March 2016 by Warner Home Video. As for Canada, both DVD and Blu-ray Disc were released under Bilingual Edition on 10 November 2015.

In Australia and New Zealand, DVD and Blu-ray were released by ABC DVD/Village Roadshow on 8 October 2015.

Books
In the United Kingdom, an accompanying hardcover format was written by Mike Gunton and Rupert Barrington. It was released on 9 October 2014 and published by BBC Books.

References

External links

Life Story at BBC Earth
Life Story at BBC Earth Asia
Life Story at BBC Earth Nordic
Life Story at BBC Earth Poland (in Polish)
Life Story official site at OpenLearn

Life Story at CBC
Life Story at Discovery Channel
Life Story trailer at YouTube

BBC high definition shows
BBC television documentaries
2014 British television series debuts
2014 British television series endings
Documentary films about nature
David Attenborough
English-language television shows
Television series by BBC Studios
Discovery Channel original programming